West Australian refers to people or things from the Australian state of Western Australia. 

West Australian may also refer to:

 The West Australian, an Australian daily newspaper
 West Australian (horse), a British Thoroughbred racehorse
 West Australian Airways, a defunct Australian airline
 West Australian Football Club, a defunct Australian rules football club